The 5th Frigate Squadron was an administrative unit of the Royal Navy from 1946 to 1980.

Operational history
During its existence, the squadron included , Type 15,  and  frigates. Ships of the squadron participated in the Suez Campaign, Beira Patrol, the Silver Jubilee Fleet Review, the Armilla Patrol and the Falklands War.

Silver Jubilee 1977
At the Silver Jubilee Fleet Review, 24–29 June 1977, 5th Frigate Squadron comprised:
  – Capt J. A. B. Thomas, RN (Captain Fifth Frigate Squadron)
  – Capt P. J. Symons, RN 
  – Cdr J. R. Griffiths, RN

Squadron commander

See also
 List of squadrons and flotillas of the Royal Navy

References

Frigate squadrons of the Royal Navy